In mathematics, an antiunitary transformation, is a bijective antilinear map

between two complex Hilbert spaces such that 

If additionally one has  then  is called an antiunitary operator.

Antiunitary operators are important in quantum theory because they are used to represent certain symmetries, such as time reversal.  Their fundamental importance in quantum physics is further demonstrated by Wigner's theorem.

Invariance transformations
In quantum mechanics, the invariance transformations of complex Hilbert space  leave the absolute value of scalar product invariant:

 

Due to Wigner's theorem these transformations can either be unitary or antiunitary.

Geometric Interpretation

Congruences of the plane form two distinct classes. The first conserves the orientation and is generated by translations and rotations. The second does not conserve the orientation and is obtained from the first class by applying a reflection. On the complex plane these two classes correspond (up to translation) to unitaries and antiunitaries, respectively.

Properties
  holds for all elements  of the Hilbert space and an antiunitary .
 When  is antiunitary then  is unitary. This follows from 
 For unitary operator  the operator , where  is complex conjugate operator, is antiunitary. The reverse is also true, for antiunitary  the operator  is unitary.
 For antiunitary  the definition of the adjoint operator  is changed to compensate the complex conjugation, becoming 

Examples
 The complex conjugate operator   is an antiunitary operator on the complex plane.
It satisfies .

Decomposition of an antiunitary operator into a direct sum of elementary Wigner antiunitaries

An antiunitary operator on a finite-dimensional space may be decomposed as a direct sum of elementary Wigner antiunitaries , . The operator  is just simple complex conjugation on 

For , the operator  acts on two-dimensional complex Hilbert space. It is defined by 

Note that for 

so such  may not be further decomposed into  which square to the identity map.

Note that the above decomposition of antiunitary operators contrasts with the spectral decomposition of unitary operators.  In particular, a unitary operator on a complex Hilbert space may be decomposed into a direct sum of unitaries acting on 1-dimensional complex spaces (eigenspaces), but an antiunitary operator may only be decomposed into a direct sum of elementary operators on 1- and 2-dimensional complex spaces.

References

Wigner, E. "Normal Form of Antiunitary Operators", Journal of Mathematical Physics Vol 1, no 5, 1960, pp. 409–412
Wigner, E. "Phenomenological Distinction between Unitary and Antiunitary Symmetry Operators", Journal of Mathematical Physics Vol1, no5, 1960, pp.414–416

See also
Unitary operator
Wigner's Theorem
Particle physics and representation theory

Linear algebra
Functional analysis